James Gordon Reid (8 June 1939 – 26 November 2003) was a Scottish actor.

Early life and career
Reid was born in Hamilton, Lanarkshire, Scotland. Educated at the former Hamilton Academy he then trained at the Royal Scottish Academy of Music and Drama, graduating in 1962 with the silver medal for Acting.

His extensive acting credits included the chemist Angus Livingstone on the television series Doctor Finlay from 1993 to 1996. Other television credits included Doctor Who, Peak Practice, Lovejoy, and Taggart. Films included Leon the Pig Farmer (1992), The Others and Mansfield Park. On stage, he spent three years with the Royal Shakespeare Company and played in the West End production of Me and My Girl. A major radio credit was as Angel Two in the BBC serialisation of James Follett's Earthsearch dramas.

Death
He collapsed and died on stage at the Finborough Theatre at Earls Court, London on the evening of 26 November 2003 halfway through Act Two of a performance of Samuel Beckett's Waiting for Godot in the role of Vladimir, aged 64.

Filmography

References

External links

 
 
 Details of the production of Waiting for Godot at the Finborough Theatre including a copy of an obituary from The Independent

1939 births
2003 deaths
People educated at Hamilton Academy
People from Hamilton, South Lanarkshire
Scottish male film actors
Scottish male stage actors
Scottish male television actors
Deaths onstage